Histone acetyltransferase 1, also known as HAT1, is an enzyme that, in humans, is encoded by the HAT1 gene.

Function 

The protein encoded by this gene is a type B histone acetyltransferase (HAT) that is involved in the rapid acetylation of newly synthesized cytoplasmic histones, which are, in turn, imported into the nucleus for de novo deposition onto nascent DNA chains. Histone acetylation, in particular, of histone H4, plays an important role in replication-dependent chromatin assembly. To be specific, this HAT can acetylate soluble but not nucleosomal histone H4 at lysines 5 and 12, and, to a lesser degree, histone H2A at lysine 5.

References

Further reading